Below is the list of current Commonwealth Records for finswimming. The records are ratified by the Commonwealth Finswimming Committee, which is made up of the National Finswimming Governing Bodies of Commonwealth of Nations. The First Commonwealth Championships were held in Hobart, Tasmania, Australia in February 2007.

This page does not include the Commonwealth Finswimming Championship Records. This list echoes that found on the Swansea Finswimming Club Website and the British Finswimming Association documents website. These records are correct as of 4 December 2008.
Times set before the First Commonwealth Championships have been allowed. All records have been accepted as a result of documentary evidence of the events or time-trials that they were set at.

Currently there are only four nations hold records: Australia (10), England (8), New Zealand (7) and Singapore (5). Finswimming is currently competed in eight Commonwealth Countries (including home nations); Australia, Canada, Cyprus, England, New Zealand, Scotland, Singapore, South Africa and Wales.

Long course metres

Men 

The records listed are correct as of 13 April 2008.

Women 
The records listed are correct as of 13 April 2008.

Short course metres 

These have yet to be fully compiled. This may contain errors.

Men 

The records listed are correct as of 13 April 2008.

Women 

The records listed are correct as of 13 April 2008.

Notes and references

Notes

Other notes on these records will be put here when they arise.

References
 Canadian Underwater Games Association
 British Finswimming Association
 Ozfin, Australian Finswimming Association
 Swansea Finswimming Club Commonwealth Records Page
 British Finswimming Association documents website
 Rotorua Geyser Dolphins
 Confederation Mondial des Activities Sub-aquatiques
 The East London Dispatch, 3 May 2003

Finswimming records